Southern Hostility is the fifth studio album by American metalcore band Upon a Burning Body. The album was released on June 7, 2019 through Seek & Strike Records.

Background 
The album was produced by Christopher Mora while being recorded and written over eight weeks with guitarist Ruben Alvarez's younger brother Thomas Alvarez.

Critical reception 
Max Morin of Exclaim! describes the album as "about as back-to-roots as it gets" going on to say that the work "sounds like a bunch of Pantera and Lamb of God fans playing in a backyard in 2010".

Dan McHugh of Distorted Sound Magazine stated that '[song] "Southern Hostility" skips the pleasantries by greeting you with an utterly savage intro/breakdown before King Of Diamonds smothers you in groove infused riffing and a bouncy tempo'.

Track listing

References

Upon a Burning Body albums
2019 albums